The Snap Elect was a London-based four member pop rock band. Their music is described by critics as a combination of melodic power pop and psychedelic rock. The group formed in 2009; it included former members of Glasgow bands Uncle John & Whitelock and The Needles. They released one album, Mangled Angle Land in 2010, which was recorded on reel-to-reel tape at Redchurch Recordings in Hackney with later-added digital overdubs. The album cover was designed by comic book artist Karrie Fransman. Dignan Porch supported at their album launch at The George Tavern in Stepney. The band were included in Vic Galloway’s 50 Scottish artists to watch in 2011, and received national radio play on BBC Introducing with Tom Robinson.

References

Citations

References 

 
 
 
 
 
 
 
 
 
 
 
 
 

British rock music groups
British pop music groups